Stuart may refer to:

Names
Stuart (name), a given name and surname (and list of people with the name)

Automobile
Stuart (automobile)

Places

Australia

Generally
Stuart Highway, connecting South Australia and the Northern Territory

Northern Territory 
Stuart, the former name for Alice Springs (changed 1933)
Stuart Park, an inner city suburb of Darwin
Central Mount Stuart, a mountain peak

Queensland 
Stuart, Queensland, a suburb of Townsville
Mount Stuart, Queensland, a suburb of Townsville
Mount Stuart (Queensland), a mountain

South Australia 
Stuart, South Australia, a locality in the Mid Murray Council
Electoral district of Stuart, a state electoral district
Hundred of Stuart, a cadastral unit

Canada 

Stuart Channel, a strait in the Gulf of Georgia region of British Columbia

United Kingdom 

Castle Stuart

United States 

Stuart, Florida
Stuart, Iowa
Stuart, Nebraska
Stuart, Oklahoma
Stuart, Virginia
Stuart Township, Holt County, Nebraska
Stuart School of Business,  Illinois Institute of Technology
Mount Stuart, Washington, a mountain in the Cascade Range
J.M. Stuart Station, a coal-fired power plant in Adams County, Ohio

Other uses
Stuart Little, a book by EB White 
House of Stuart, a royal house of Scotland and England
Clan Stuart of Bute, a Scottish clan
 Stuart period, a historical era in Britain coinciding with the rule of the Stuart dynasty
 Kerr, Stuart and Company, English railway locomotive manufacturer
 M3 Stuart tank, American World War II tank named after J. E. B. Stuart
 HMAS Stuart (D00), an Admiralty-type destroyer leader launched in 1918
 HMAS Stuart (DE 48), a River-class destroyer escort commissioned in 1963
 HMAS Stuart (FFH 153), an Anzac-class frigate commissioned in 2002

See also
Sobieski Stuarts
Stewart (disambiguation)
Steuart (disambiguation)
Stu
Justice Stuart (disambiguation)
Mount Stuart (disambiguation)